Wallsend was a parliamentary constituency centred on Wallsend, a town on the north bank of the River Tyne in North Tyneside.

It returned one Member of Parliament (MP) to the House of Commons of the Parliament of the United Kingdom from 1918 to 1997.

History
Wallsend was created as a parliamentary borough constituency under the Representation of the People Act 1918 and was formed from the majority of the abolished Northumberland county division of Tyneside.

It was abolished for the 1997 general election when the majority of the constituency formed the new seat of North Tyneside, but the town of Wallsend itself (the Wallsend and Northumberland wards) was added to Newcastle upon Tyne East to form Newcastle upon Tyne East and Wallsend. Although this was reversed at the next periodic review of constituencies for the 2010 general election, the former constituency name was not re-established, so Wallsend is now included in the North Tyneside constituency.

After middle-class Gosforth was moved out of the seat in the 1983 boundary changes, the constituency had the country's highest percentage of working-class voters at 84% of the electorate.

Boundaries

1918–1950 

 the Municipal Borough of Wallsend; and
 the Urban Districts of Gosforth, Longbenton, and Weetslade.

1950–1983 

 the Municipal Borough of Wallsend; and
 the Urban Districts of Gosforth and Longbenton.

Weetslade UD had been absorbed by Longbenton UD in 1935, but the constituency boundaries remained largely unchanged.

1983–1997 

 the Metropolitan Borough of North Tyneside wards of Battle Hill, Benton, Camperdown, Holystone, Howdon, Longbenton, Northumberland, Valley, Wallsend, and Weetslade.

As a result of the reorganisation of local authorities resulting from the Local Government Act 1972, the area comprising the former Urban District of Gosforth was now part of the City of Newcastle upon Tyne and consequently included in the constituencies of Newcastle upon Tyne Central and Newcastle upon Tyne North. The constituency gained the communities of Backworth and Earsdon which had previously been part of the seat of Blyth. Other minor boundary changes in line with changes to local authority and ward boundaries.

Members of Parliament

Elections

Elections in the 1910s

Elections in the 1920s

Elections in the 1930s

Election in the 1940s

Elections in the 1950s

Elections in the 1960s

Elections in the 1970s

Elections in the 1980s
Joan Phylactou, twice SDP candidate, was a senior lecturer at Newcastle Polytechnic. 1983 Conservative candidate Mary Leigh was a solicitor and councillor for St Leonard's ward in Lambeth. 1987 Conservative candidate David Milburn was a salesman and trade unionist who had previously been a Labour member before joining the Conservatives in 1974; at the party's 1980 conference he had called for Keith Joseph to be sacked and Edward Heath brought into the cabinet, accusing the Thatcher government of murder over unemployment-linked suicides.

Elections in the 1990s

See also

 History of parliamentary constituencies and boundaries in Northumberland
 History of parliamentary constituencies and boundaries in Tyne and Wear

Notes and references

Parliamentary constituencies in Tyne and Wear (historic)
Constituencies of the Parliament of the United Kingdom established in 1918
Constituencies of the Parliament of the United Kingdom disestablished in 1997
Metropolitan Borough of North Tyneside